In mathematics, a quasi-split group over a field is a reductive group with a Borel subgroup defined over the field.  Simply connected quasi-split groups over a field correspond to actions of the absolute Galois group on a Dynkin diagram.

Examples
All split groups (those with a split maximal torus) are quasi-split. These correspond to quasi-split groups where the action of the Galois group on the Dynkin diagram is trivial.

 showed that all simple algebraic groups over finite fields are quasi-split.

Over the real numbers, the quasi-split groups include the split groups and the complex groups, together with the orthogonal groups On,n+2, the unitary groups SUn,n and SUn,n+1, and the form of E6 with signature 2.

References

Linear algebraic groups